Mariawald Abbey was a monastery of the Trappists (formally known as the Cistercians of the Strict Observance), located above the village of Heimbach, in the district of Düren in the Eifel, in the forests around Kermeter, North Rhine-Westphalia, Germany. In September 2018, the last remaining monks left Mariawald Abbey and the monastery is currently up for sale.

History

Cistercians
Following Heinrich Fluitter's vision of the Blessed Virgin Mary, a shrine and chapel were built on the site of it, which became a place of pilgrimage, the Marienwallfahrt. For the proper care of the site and the pilgrims land was given in 1480 to the Cistercians of Bottenbroich Abbey, who established a priory here, which they were able to move into on 4 April 1486. The new monastery took its name from the shrine to Mary and from the woods in which it was situated: "Marienwald", or "Mary's wood"

In 1795 the monastery was closed as a result of the French Revolution and the monks were expelled. The image of the Virgin was removed to safety in Heimbach. The priory buildings were abandoned and allowed to fall into decay.

Trappists
In 1860 the priory was re-settled by Trappist monks from Oelenberg Abbey in Alsace.

From 1875 to 1887 the monks were exiled because of the Kulturkampf ("cultural conflict") policies of the Imperial German government. In 1909, Mariawald was raised from the status of priory to that of an abbey.

The monks had to leave the monastery yet again under the Nazi regime during World War II, from 1941 until April 1945, when the surviving members of the community were able to return. The monastery had to be largely rebuilt, because it had been seriously damaged in the war.

After World War II, a brewery was run at the abbey until 1956 when beer production ceased, in part due to availability of water and brewing ingredients.

Present day
Mariawald Abbey is the only extant men's Trappist monastery in Germany.

The monks follow the Rule of St. Benedict and the constitution of the Cistercians of the Strict Observance. Visitors can also stay a few days in the abbey's guesthouse, but the parts of the monastery used by the monastic community cannot be visited.

The abbey runs a tavern and bookshop. It also produces and sells its own liqueur. In 1997 it was one of eight Trappist abbeys which founded the International Trappist Association (ITA) to protect the Trappist name from commercial misuse. By the end of January 2018 became known that somewhere in the year the abbey will be closed and the monks distributed over other abbeys.
The monastery has now been officially closed. However, the tavern and bookshop remain open and the production of liqueur is still ongoing.

The abbey's motto is Luceat lux vestra ("Let your light shine"), from Matthew 5.16.

In late 2018, the association "Trappistenkonvent Mariawald e.V." had been renamed in "Kloster Mariawald e.V.". New members joined this associaten, and they elected a new executive board.

Old Rite
During the tumultuous 1960s, the abbey embraced the current liturgical fashions. However, in 2008 on the Feast of the Presentation of Our Lady in the Temple (21 November), Mariawald Abbey gained from Pope Benedict XVI permission to return to the Old Rite and their original religious discipline. This makes Mariawald unique among Trappist monasteries around the world, in that they adhere to their traditional, strict rule, including the office of the liturgical books in force in the Catholic Church in 1962 (particularly the traditional Latin Mass according to the old Trappist use).

Abbots
Laurentius Wimmer (1909–1929)
Stephan Sauer (1929–1939)
Christophorus Elsen (1947–1961)
Andreas Schmidt (1961–1966)
Otto Aßfalg (1967–1980)
Meinrad Behren (1983–1992)
Franziskus de Place (1993–1999)
Bruno Gooskens (1999–2005)
Josef Vollberg (2006–2016) from 2017 as prior

References

External links
Mariawald Abbey website 

Religious buildings and structures completed in 1486
Trappist monasteries in Germany
Monasteries in North Rhine-Westphalia
1480s establishments in the Holy Roman Empire
Religious organizations established in the 1480s
Christian monasteries established in the 15th century
Buildings and structures in Düren (district)
1486 establishments in Europe
2018 disestablishments in Germany